Antonio Villamor (born  1931) is a Filipino former basketball player who competed in the 1956 Summer Olympics. He played for NU Bulldogs in the UAAP, leading the team to their first UAAP Basketball Championship in 1954.

References

External links
 

1930s births
Possibly living people
Olympic basketball players of the Philippines
Basketball players at the 1956 Summer Olympics
NU Bulldogs basketball players
Asian Games medalists in basketball
Basketball players at the 1958 Asian Games
Philippines men's national basketball team players
Filipino men's basketball players
Asian Games gold medalists for the Philippines
Medalists at the 1958 Asian Games
Year of birth uncertain